Canon is a 1964 National Film Board of Canada animated short co-directed by Norman McLaren and Grant Munro that offers a visual representation of the canon musical form through three animated segments. The soundtrack combines both a recorded classical score by Eldon Rathburn and electronic sounds produced via synthesizer.

Awards
 Montreal International Film Festival, Montreal: First Prize, Best Animated Film, 1965
 3rd International Film Festival of India, New Delhi: Bronze Peacock, Second Prize, 1965
 17th Canadian Film Awards, Toronto: Genie Award for Best Film, Arts and Experimental, 1965

References

External links

1964 films
1964 animated films
Animated films without speech
National Film Board of Canada animated short films
Films based on music
Visual music
Films directed by Norman McLaren
Films scored by Eldon Rathburn
Canadian animated short films
Quebec films
1960s Canadian films